The Wasserbergfirst (2,341 m) is a mountain of the Schwyz Alps, located south of Muotathal in the canton of Schwyz. It lies on the range between the Hürital and the Bisistal, north of the Schächentaler Windgällen.

References

External links
 Wasserbergfirst on Hikr

Mountains of Switzerland
Mountains of the Alps
Mountains of the canton of Schwyz